This is a list of characters in the animated television show Kappa Mikey.

Main

Mikey Simon 

Voiced by: Michael Sinterniklaas

Michael Alexander "Mikey" Simon is the main character of the show. He is a 19-year-old American actor from Cleveland, Ohio, but wins a contest to appear on the LilyMu show in Tokyo, Japan. On the show, he portrays the superhero and main lead Kappa Mikey. Mikey is somewhat self-centered and immature. He is oblivious to the world around him unless it gets him his way, and will do anything to get what he wants via plans that often get him and those around him into trouble.

Gonard

Voiced by: Sean Schemmel

Gonard plays the part of LilyMu'''s main antagonist, a purple-skinned, blue-haired humanoid set on either domination or destruction. In reality, Gonard is actually a sweet-natured young man who is best friends with Mikey and appears to be ignorant and dim-witted. As opposed to the purple skin of his LilyMu character, Gonard actually possesses a more natural skin tone, albeit like Mitsuki, his hair is actually blue. He is the tallest of the LilyMu cast members.

Guano

Voiced by: Gary Mack

Guano is a small purple creature with long pointed ears (similar to those of a rabbit), whiskers, a long thin tail topped with a ball of fur, and a blue crystal on his abdomen. On LilyMu, he portrays a small purple being that helps the team fight crime and is capable of uttering nothing more than his name, "Guano." Other than being featured in the actual LilyMu television series, he also is the program's scriptwriter and director. Guano is friendly, but has the tendency to fear or stress out about work or his friends' antic related problems. Guano is secretive of his life before Lilymu and is also a superhero named The Masked Tanuki. In the Kappa Mikey Christmas special, it was revealed that Guano is actually a human and Ozu's long-lost son.

Lily
Voiced by: Kether Donohue

Lily is an actress who portrays the damsel-in-distress role in all of the episodes of the anime series "LilyMu," who Mikey often saves as his fictional superhero alter-ego, Kappa Mikey. But in reality, Lily is a temperamental and self-centered woman who was the original star of "LilyMu" before Mikey joined the cast. She commonly wears a modified version of a sailor fuku, yet also tries to keep up with popular fashions in order to stay on lists for best-dressed celebrities. Because Mikey has taken her role as the star of "LilyMu," Lily openly hates him, who is unaware of this as he is in love with her.

Mitsuki
Voiced by: Carrie Keranen

Mitsuki is a friendly, selfless young woman. She plays a headstrong bad girl on the show. Mitsuki often appears to be the most sensible character. She is best friends with Lily, though Lily will insult or belittle her on a daily basis. She has a crush on Mikey, who is too clueless to notice her affections. Before she became an actress, Mitsuki was a secret agent.

Ozu

Voiced by: Stephen Moverley

Ozu is the producer of LilyMu and owns various things in Tokyo. When he was a kid his parents took him to the country side to practice karate, and likely later moved there when he got his own home. He has also had a prized bonsai tree since his birth. Ozu is short-tempered, bossy and very demanding. Ozu treats Mikey better than the other cast members. Ozu means well, has a sweet side and at times bails them out of trouble. He is mostly concerned more about the show's ratings and reception and is very money-oriented. Before being a producer he was a young adult who lived in the country with his wife Kiyoko and had a son, who would be later known as his director Guano unknown to Ozu. However Kiyoko and Guano disappeared while he was earning a fortune in Tokyo for his new family. With this great loss, he then decided to focus his entire life on being a producer, though he couldn't ever let go what happened to his family especially during Christmas.

Yes Man

Voiced by: Jesse Adams

A hyperactive, overdramatic yes man–servant–scapegoat to Ozu who agrees with everything Ozu says. Sometimes he wish he had more recognition and was an actor, but mainly he enjoys working for his boss and is very joyful or lack minded .

Secondary

These characters appear at least several times in episodes that follow each of their debut appearances. They are voiced by the principal cast. Most of the Season One characters appear again at the Christmas party in A Christmas Mikey. Characters from both seasons appear again in the crowd during Live LilyMu. Because the show's credits do not match up the voice actors with the characters in the list below, the people who voice each individual minor character are unknown for the most part.

Yoshi

Voiced by: Jesse Adams

The main camera man for the LilyMu series, Yoshi is a shy, blond, beer-bellied man, who is featured in many episodes, sometimes as a main role (such as in Battle of the Band), but mostly as an easter egg. He appears to live in LilyMu Towers with the other cast members. Like Yes Man, he is frequently prone to be the butt of violence, regardless of intention.

He is a pirate, as was shown in the episode Ship of Fools. In The Bracemaster, he was Dr. Katashi's assistant, and was a dentist, and a member of the Onis in The Oni Express. In The Wizard of Ozu, he plays the part of the Tinman, but the rest of the cast ignores him and he is thus left rusting in the rain. In "Fashion Frenzy", when Lily is talking about her favorite designer making 3-legged pants, Yoshi reveals to the cast that he has 3 legs, but this has only been mentioned in this episode.

Dancing Sushi

Little sushi-beings that serve as scene transitions or bumpers. They dance around and make cute noises. They are sometimes accompanied by other random characters, such as a sushi chef or a sumo wrestler. They rarely appear out of bumpers, and when they do, it's for a split-second. The three main sushi beings starred in the Kappa Mikey spin-off mini-series, called Dancing Sushi. In this show, their names are Larry (after Larry Schwarz), Roro, and Salmon, and a female sushi named Meep was created to round out the main cast.

Socky

Voiced by: Adam Moreno

A sock puppet pop icon with a mind of its own, spokesperson for Hitoshi Beauty Cream, and rival of Lily for Tokyo Trend's Top 50 Most Beautiful list. Socky has become one of LilyMu's most persistent antagonists, having appeared in Mikey At The Bat, and in Mitsuki Vanishes, where he attempts to get Lily, and later, Mitsuki, to star in his new television projects. He  has 3 female dancers that follow him around and act as his entourage, as well as a body guard.

Ethel

Voiced by: Kether Donahue

Ethel is an old lady who appears at least once in every episode, sometimes in a speaking role, but mostly as a background extra.

The Cat Burglar

Voiced by: Wayne Grayson

An unnamed bandit who steals the invisibility coat in The Fugi-Kid. Throughout the episode, he was thought to have only one arm, due to the other being covered by the coat during the Mikey-witnessed theft. Agent Yoshida has been chasing him for five years-he has stolen over 2,000 cats, plus the bank robberies he committed using the coat and framed Mikey for. Known to Mikey as "The One-Armed Man" until revealed that the coat was covering one arm. He makes a second appearance in LilyMeow, revealing that he eats the cats after he catches them and that he is also allergic to cats, developing a rash all over his body and going into fits of sneezing when he comes near one. The Cat Burglar makes a third appearance halfway through The Masked Tanuki, where he kidnaps Mikey, Guano and Gonard as revenge for putting him in jail. He is no longer allergic to cats and treats them like his minions. His last appearance is in "Mikey's Memoirs", where he tries to kill Mikey for stealing an album that was originally stolen by him, and wants credit for it.

Mr. and Mrs. Simon

Voiced by: Dan Green and Zoe Martin

Mr. and Mrs. Simon Are Mikey's Parents. They are unseen characters, but they have been featured in the episodes The Lost Pilot, Easy Come, Easy Gonard, Lost in Transportation, The Switch, Saving Face, and La Cage Aux Mikey. Their rather offbeat answering machine messages nearly always give some sort of help - even if it isn't in the way one would expect. Mikey appears to be their only child.

Speed Racer

An older, androgynous version of the famed racer. Speed makes a cameo appearance in the theme song as the LilyMu team's limousine driver, and in the pilot episode. Despite having the body of a middle-aged man, the character has eyelashes and the a deep feminine voice like that of a young boy. In A Christmas Mikey, Speed can be seen as the hypothetical scratch card contest winner for LilyMu, in place of Mikey, yelling "I'm back!" However, this choice drops the rating for LilyMu down enough for Ozu to cancel the show. Speed again has a speaking role in "Mikey And the Pauper", where the character drives Mikey and Guano to the Filth District, and gets attacked by a gigantic squid tentacle.

Gonard's Mother

Voiced by: Sean Schemmel

Gonard still lives with her. In The Switch she has a woman's voice, while in The Fugi-kid, and all the succeeding episodes, she is voiced by Sean Schemmel in a falsetto voice with an Irish accent.

The Kappas

Voiced by: Carrie Keranen

The kappas are water spirits that are based on the creature of the same name in Japanese folklore who Mikey's LilyMu character is named after, they are described by Ozu as fish out of water and Mikey being an American in Japan. They live around a river in the middle of the jungle. They talk in impish, caveman-like voices. They meet Mikey in Mikey, Kappa. They initially try to sacrifice Mikey to the snakes, but once they realize it is the hero they saw on television, they praise him and express their fandom. Mikey realizes his littering causes their water supply to run out, making them ill, and brings their water back. In The Wizard of Ozu, the kappas appear again to play the role of the flying monkeys.

Dr. Takashi Katashi

Voiced by: Wayne Grayson

In "Plastic Surgeon To The Stars", he wears a generic doctor headband over his eye,. He performs an unintentional 'pimple enlargement' on Mikey. He did plastic surgery on Socky, to make him beautiful, information which led to Socky's downfall. Katashi also appears to have a degree in dentistry, according to The Bracemaster. He performs a check-up on Mikey, Gonard, Lily, and Mitsuki, and reports that only Mikey has an overbite, and needs a retainer. Katashi has a dark side as well; he steals Ozu's retainer and family heirloom for its value, with plans to sell it for a green sports car.

Agent Yoshida

Voiced by: Michael Alston Baley

A Japanese government agent who arrested Mikey for a crime he did not commit. However, later on, he arrests the real crook, with Mikey's help. Agent Yoshida is hired by Ozu to investigate a DVD infringement ring in Back To School. However, after months on the case, he finds no suspects. With LilyMu's help, he finally arrests the students behind the crime.

Pirate Captain/King Pirate

Voiced by: Sean Schemmel

Captain of a pirate ship and five other pirates. He first appears in episode Ship of Fools when he gives Mikey a "pirated" video game in exchange for Gonard. Mikey manages to frighten the pirate into abandoning ship in order to save Gonard. In La Cage Aux Mikey, the Captain fills in for Mikey's dad after they announce their cancelled trip to Japan. In Lost in Transportation, The Captain is seen as an honorary member of the Chums, the center photo of the wall. He makes an appearance in a sumo outfit in The Sumo of All Fears. In "Go Nard Hunting" he replaces Gonard's role on LilyMu.

Masako Masako

Voiced by: Lex Woutas

Tokyo's most beloved red-carpet fashion critic in Battle of the Bands, her first appearance, and motherly talk show host in Script Assassin. Her voice is low enough to be voiced by a man, which is indeed the case. She appears again as a news correspondent in The Karaoke Episode: Part II.

Lex Woutas has a more prominent role in Three Delivery as the villain, Kong Li.

The Chums

A gang of outcast bikers who accept Mikey as an "honorary member" when he is convinced that the rest of the LilyMu cast are leaving him out of activities in Lost In Transportation. They are big fans of LilyMu. Mikey is most acquainted to their leader, Beef, who teaches him the Chums bear-hug. Mikey eventually becomes friends again with the cast, but the Chums keep in touch with him using a whistle whenever he needs help. The motorcycle they give him has been used in several LilyMu sequences.

Beef returns in La Cage Aux Mikey to impersonate Mikey's mom, and in Hog Day Afternoon as the owner of a bike shop. It is in Hog Day Afternoon that Mikey finally uses the whistle they gave him, but they don't respond. It turns out they were late in saving him, due to a Viking parade. Mikey is currently under temporary probation, instead of being kicked out of the Chums. In Script Assassin, he has a conversation with Guano at the bar in his cafe, during Guano's depression state.

Kenji

A Tokyo street urchin who loves the LilyMu show. He has a speaking role in Easy Come, Easy Gonard, Manic Monday, Seven from LilyMu, Mikey's Memoirs, but it's only until Mikey and the Pauper where his name is given. He has a dog named Mr. Poopers and many friends, including Mikey look-alike Jomar.

Mr. Stereo

Voiced by: Wayne Grayson

One of Ozu's company sponsors and business partners in Lost In Transportation. Mr. Stereo sells stereos at bargain prices, and claims that if his stereos don't please his customers, he will do crazy things, even though he does them anyway. He has a spoiled son named Timmy who is a huge fan of LilyMu. Mr. Stereo appears again in Seven LilyMu to host the LilyMu live performance in the Megastore, in honor of his tenth store.

The Tatami Twins

Voiced by: Bella Hudson

Two fat children who are the sons of Mr. Tatami. They mistake Guano for a toy, and even throw Lily and Mitsuki into the 'Tatami Room' for 'shoplifting' . They make a second appearance in Manic Monday, purchasing Gonard and Guano's cursed tiki idol, in an attempt to pass on the bad luck.

Minor

These characters have major roles in one episode each, and do not appear again, save for a brief cameo.

Brozu and No Man

Voiced by: Stephen Moverly and Jesse Adams

Brozu is Ozu's older twin brother who claims to be the Lord of the Dance. He appears in the episode Big Brozu. Brozu has his own hip hop version of Yes Man named No Man and who does the turn tables for Brozu's songs. Since he was born one second before Ozu, he claims ownership of 51% of the company and has legal right to take over and change the LilyMu show from an action theme into a street dancing theme. He fired Ozu and made Mikey the show's new producer, and Mikey, of course, was totally unfit for the job. Ozu regained control of his company after he and Mikey beat Brozu in a dancing contest.

Ori and Yori

Ori and Yori are Tokyo's hottest rock stars. They appeared in the episode Battle of the Bands where they appeared on their own television show. They later appeared in The Clip Show when one of their songs was played during the flashback of the LilyMu gang's friends. Ori and Yori are based on the Japanese pop band Puffy AmiYumi

The Karaoke Genie

Voiced by: Marc Diraison

The green genie is the DJ of a magical karaoke machine that Mikey uncovers in "The Karaoke Episode". He puts a curse on the principal cast members to make Mikey appreciate the value of singing.

Dadzuki

Voiced by: Dan Green

Dadzuki is Mitsuki's mustached father, and the most acclaimed kabuki actor in Japan. He has naturally blue hair and green eyes, like his daughter, and talks in a Shakespearian, dramatic voice. In Mitsuki Butterfly, he breaks his foot immediately before a play starts, and after some convincing by Mitsuki, she covertly covers for him. But he swears to her never to reveal her identity to the audience, because Japanese tradition dictates, no woman can ever perform kabuki. When Mikey fawns over Mitsuki in her kabuki role and later visits her in the dressing room, she and Dadzuki go to great lengths to prevent him from getting close enough to her to recognize her, lest their secret be revealed. Dadzuki has a cameo in The Karaoke Episode in the crowd during "Heart", and can be seen performing during "Bounce". He also appears briefly in Live LilyMu.

Scoop Suzuki

Editor-in-chief of a tabloid newspaper The Daily Scoop in Japan. In Saving Face he threatened to expose Mikey's pimple to the masses unless he could get embarrassing photos of his friends, to which Mikey complied. In La Cage Aux Mikey, he is revealed to have a cousin in America who works for a newspaper in Mikey's hometown of Cleveland.

Suave Mikey

Voiced by: Michael Sinterniklaas

Suave Mikey appeared in Ship of Fools. He looks like Mikey, except for his black sunglasses and refined demeanor. Lily is enamored with him while Mitsuki thinks he's a jerk.

Mr. Tatami

Voiced by: Lex Woutas

The former owner of Tatami Megastore, a carrier of LilyMu merchandise, and the Tatami Room. Father of the Tatami Twins. Mikey owes him 20 million yen, until Ozu buys the Megastore from him, making him an employee of Ozu.

Lawrence Von Martenhouse

Voiced by: Marc Thompson

An American actor who played Captain Impressive on American TV several years back, and became Mikey's childhood hero. He puts on a rather embarrassing Dum-Dum Show at the Tatami Megastore, which 'inspires' Mikey to become a bad boy to avoid suffering a similar fate. Mikey realizes his mistake and calls on Von Martenhouse to play Captain Impressive one last time, trying to stop a riot that Mikey started. An impressed Ozu puts Von Martenhouse back on TV, on The Dum-Dum Hour.

Kello

Voiced by: Zoe Martin

A small kitten that wandered onto the LilyMu set one day in Lily Meow. Mikey adopts her in order to get attention for himself, but Kello ends up stealing the spotlight from the entire LilyMu cast due to her "cuteness", getting everyone (except Guano) fired for being jealous of her, she gets angry, and almost gets them killed. Ozu had her "banished" to a Teletubbies-like TV show where she is thrown up in the air and sprayed with water.

Dr. Igor

Voiced by: Marc Diraison

Appearing in Big Trouble In Little Tokyo, Dr. Igor is a mad scientist who lives on in the 'secret floor' (the 13th) of LilyMu Towers. He claims to have created all the monsters in the old monster movies, and invented ways of making them huge. Now, he makes a hobby out of shrinking monsters so they become tiny. He fled when Ozu told him he owed forty years worth of unpaid rent. However, he was seen later in a brief cameo in La Femme Mitsuki, in which he revealed he worked part-time as a movie usher.

Forbes

Voiced by: Seth Herzog

Dr. Igor's "son" and assistant. He resembles a demon with a fox's face, bat's ears and wings, chicken's feet, scaly arms, goat's horns and a tail in contrast to Dr. Igor's human appearance. He later appeared in Live LilyMu.

Miko and Kai

Two LilyMu fanatics who welcome Mikey into their SuperFans Club in With Fans Like These. Besides Mikey, it turns out their club only consists of the two of them, and is held in Miko's mother's basement. They hound Mikey to the point of being a nuisance, and Mikey gets rid of them with the help of Mitsuki, who introduces them to a couple of fangirls of her own.

Agent F

Only seen inside the disguise of a U.S. post box, Agent F is a secret agent who pleads with Mitsuki to return to her old job in La Femme Mitsuki, addressing her by her former name "Agent M". She refuses, being perfectly happy and content now as an actress living the "normal life" that she desired. Although slightly bumbling and limited as to what he is able to do from being stuck inside the mailbox, he will stop at nothing to get her back, even trying to harm Mikey He writes poems on his spare time, which he tries to keep private. Mitsuki, in getting Agent F to leave her and Mikey alone for good, threatens to expose, among other things, one of those poems.

Harmony Sunshine

An earthie (hippie) who Gonard meets and befriends in La Femme Mistuki. He presents himself as a "professional dreamer", and loves playing the bongoes and the guitar. He inspires Gonard to become an earthie himself, but Lily, sick of Gonard's and Harmony's antics, has Ozu inspire them to change their ways, turning Harmony into a conservative business career man.

Dragon

A gigantic, red, Japanese dragon in The Man Who Would Be Mikey. He awakes from his thousand-year nap underground once he discovers one of his spikes was stolen by Mikey, and wants to eat him for revenge. He eventually let Mikey off the hook when Mikey returned the missing spike to his tail. Later appeared briefly in La Femme Mitsuki.

Lawrence

Voiced by: Robert Riddell

Lawrence is Mikey's guardian angel from A Christmas Mikey. Lawrence is drawn in the style of a young bishōnen, with blond hair, blue eyes, and a scarf. He aids Mikey into learning what things would've been like if he had never won the scratch-card contest in the first place. His own goal is to get rid of the standard, issued wings that all angels have, and earn large, golden ones with triple pumping action.

Bike

Voiced by: Dan Green

In Hog Day Afternoon, Mikey upgrades his motorbike, but takes it upon himself to "borrow" a defective microchip from a store, which brings the bike to life. Temperamental and monstrous, it has the urge to destroy Mikey.

Ninjamin McFranklin

Voiced by: Sean Schemmel

Ninja owner of a restaurant chain called Ninjaman McFranklin's House of Chicken and Ninjas. In Mikey's Place he has the power to hypnotize Gonard into preparing dishes for him all with no breaks.

Evan and Carl

Voiced by: Jesse Adams (Evan)

Two Mount Lebaniku high school students who Mikey befriends, after failing to fit into any of the other cliques, in the episode Back To School. Evan is fat, wears thick glasses, and has a simple black hairstyle. Carl is short, skinny, and has blond, vertical-crescent-shaped hair. Both like to spend their lunch periods by themselves, playing fantasy RPGs. When Mikey joins them, he discovers that they're desperate and will help him in any way they can.

Reggie

Voiced by: Carrie Keranen

Reggie is a green, baby jungle crow who gets separated from its family in Like Ozu, Like Son. Taken by its cuteness, Gonard and Guano vow to raise and look after it until it can learn to fly so it can find its family again- Reggie is the name they give him. The other jungle crows think they are mistreating it, until Reggie flies in front of his new friends in defense, and thanks them by appearing on LilyMu as a guest.

The Phantom of the Soundstage

Voiced by: Sean Schemmel

The Phantom of the Soundstage shares his name with the episode he appears in. He used to be one of the original members of LilyMu. Today, he is Ozu's soundstage janitor. His purpose as the Phantom is to punish anyone who pulls a prank, ever since he himself was pranked by a new LilyMu cast member from Canada. He convinces Lily to team up with him and take revenge on Mikey with a huge prank, but Lily turns the tables on him and he is eventually arrested.

Riku and Shino

Voiced by: Zoe Martin (Riku)

Two poor children from Seven LilyMu. Riku, the younger brother, admires the LilyMu team to the point where he believes they are real superheroes, and convinces them to save their playground from being demolished. Shino, the older and more mature sister, looks after him when they are away from their parents.

Squiddy

A giant, pink squid that Mikey befriends in Free Squiddy.

Samoa

Voiced by: Morgan York

A ghoul girl who vowed revenge on all mankind after she flushed herself down the toilet in LilyBoo. She promised to lay a curse on anyone who watches a mysterious cursed DVD, scaring them with phone calls and ultimately turning them into nougat. She places a curse on the LilyMu gang, but they end the curse once they find her gobstopper. She appears to be friends with Gonard.

Reiko

A girl who auditioned for a part on LilyMu but lost out to Mitsuki, whom she has never forgiven. She began to plot revenge against her in Mitsuki Vanishes. She stole Mitsuki's train ticket out of Mikey's pocket so Mitsuki couldn't leave with the others, kidnapped Mitsuki, tied her up and smuggled her aboard the train, only to have Mikey discover Mitsuki tied up and realize something was wrong and convince the others of what he saw. After Mikey and the others grill other suspects, Reiko fesses up, then uncouples the gang's train coach from the rest of the train so she can complete her revenge on Mitsuki. The gang rides a handcar back to the train and starts after Reiko, who has grabbed Mitsuki and is making a run for it. The chase ends at Mount LilyMu, where Mikey rescues Mitsuki from a rockslide and Gonard, Guano and Lily capture Reiko trying to escape.

Richie McMillions III

Voiced by: Sean Schemmel

In Tin Putt, Richie is the owner of the exclusive miniature golf country club Mini Pines. Richie is known to enjoy a friendly game of mini-golf with Ozu from time to time. It's all in good fun, except for the fact that he cheats. He loses the country club to Ozu and the LilyMu cast in a high-stakes game to Mikey and Gonard.

Gary the Gopher

A gopher that lives below Mini Pines in Tin Putt. He enlists Guano in his efforts to free all gophers from the groundskeeper's tyranny once and for all.

Jomar

A street pauper who is looks like of Mikey. After Mikey gets tired of his acting career in Mikey and the Pauper, Jomar trades places with him. He guest stars on LilyMu'' alongside Mikey at the end of the episode.

The Ghosts of Japanese Christmas
Three ghosts who visit Ozu on Christmas when he's not in the Christmas spirit. The first ghost, a fat pink, purple and white ghost wearing a samurai helmet, takes Ozu back to his hometown of Kotoura to witness that fateful Christmas when his family Kiyoko and Guano, left him and he got upset, and then he understands why Ozu doesn't like Christmas, and then the second ghost, a blue, black and white ghost with long wiggly arms shows up and the pink ghost takes him back to witness the same thing, and that made him sad and made both ghosts realize that they'd never like Christmas again. So, Ozu and the two ghosts go to LilyMu studios and begin to wreck the Christmas party until the third ghost shows up and tells Ozu that he'd find his son on Christmas, which he does.

Kiyoko

She briefly appears in "A Christmas Mikey" when Ozu has a flashback of life in his hometown. She was Ozu's wife and the mother of Guano. Kiyoko appeared young looking with black hair, brown eyes and wore a blue kimono. Besides this flashback, she is never mentioned again in the episode or in the series.

References

Nicktoon characters
Lists of characters in American television animation
Characters

pt:Kappa Mikey#Personagens